The Institut Sup'Biotech de Paris (Sup'Biotech or ISBP) is a French private engineering school created in 2003, located in Villejuif, near Paris, and in Lyon.

Sup'Biotech is specialized in the field of biotechnology. The school delivers a 5-year program split in two parts: the first three years correspond to a bachelor's degree in biotechnology and the last two years to master's degree in biotechnology.

History 

Sup'Biotech was created in 2003 by IONIS Education Group. It provides middle management for biotechnology industry. Biotechnology industries belong mainly to health, innovation food or environment. On 11 January 2012, the degree delivered by the university was recognized level 1 by CNCP. The same year, on 21 February, the university was labeled by the Industries et Agro-Ressources (IAR) cluster. Since 8 January 2015, the university is recognized by the French Ministry of National Education. The 6 December 2016, Sup'Biotech is recognized by the Commission des Titres d'Ingénieur.

Administration

Governance 
Sup'Biotech is owned by IONIS Education Group, making Marc Sellam is the president of the university. He is assisted by a director.

Director 
Since the creation of the university, the director has been Vanessa Proux, who has a doctorate in biochemistry from the University of Technology of Compiègne.

Teaching and research

Curriculum

Bachelor in biotechnology 
First cycle of three years including a classe préparatoire aux grandes écoles of two years and one year of professionalization with a 3-month internship. During the third year, a trip abroad in a partner university education is compulsory.

Master in biotechnology 
cond two-year cycle which includes the fourth and fifth year with the choice of a specialization : research / development / production processes or marketing / sales engineer. Students also makes the choice of an option: health / medicine, environment, cosmetics, food industry or bioinformatics. During this cycle, two internship (4 and 6 months) are compulsory. Sup'Biotech has signed in January 2011 a partnership with the Cancer Institut Gustave Roussy. The majority of the courses in this cycle are given in English.

In the final year, students who wish can prepare in parallel an MBA at the Institut supérieur de gestion, a Master at IONIS STM, a Master in basic research at the University of Évry Val d'Essonne or at the École pratique des hautes études, or also a double degree with a partnership university abroad. In addition, the school has a partnership with the Ecole Centrale Paris allowing two fifth-year students to follow in parallel a Mastère Spécialisé in biomedical engineering data.

International partners 
Sup'Biotech has partnership with universities abroad, including : Tunisia Private University, University of California at San Diego, Université de Montréal, Monterrey Institute of Technology and Higher Education, University of Essex, University of Sussex, Heriot-Watt University in United Kingdom, ...

Research activities 
Sup'Biotech has opened a Bioinformatics laboratory in September 2010, called « Bio Information Research Laboratory », which purpose is the research at the interface between computing and biotechnology, and also a cellular models laboratory.
In May 2012, the university has inaugurated a new bio-production laboratory. It has also a partnership with Pasteur Institute.

Notable alumni
 Cyprien Verseux (2013), crew of the Hawaii Space Exploration Analog and Simulation IV and Station Leader of the fourteenth winterover at Concordia Station, Antarctica.

Bibliography 
 Biotechnologies. Les promesses du vivant., Villejuif, FYP Éditions, 2015, 256 p.

References

External links 
  

Biotech de Paris
Biotech Paris
Education in Lyon
Biotech de Paris
Biotech de Paris
Educational institutions established in 2003
Villejuif
2003 establishments in France